Fausto Tozzi (29 October 1921 – 10 December 1978) was an Italian film actor and screenwriter. He appeared in 70 films between 1951 and 1978. He wrote the script for The Defeated Victor, which was entered into the 9th Berlin International Film Festival. He also directed one film, Trastevere.

Life and career
Born in Rome, after graduating in accountancy Tozzi made several humble jobs, including peddler and bird taxidermist. He was introduced in the cinema industry by Sergio Amidei, for whom he worked as a  stenographer.  Through Amidei,  Tozzi met Renato Castellani, with whom he collaborated as a screenwriter for Professor, My Son (1946) and Under the Sun of Rome (1948, based on a Tozzi's original story). In the early 1950s, he also started working as an assistant director and as an actor, sometimes being cast in main roles. His typical roles were of hardmen and villains. He was also active on stage, where he is best known for the role of Gnecco in Rugantino, and on television, in which he is well known for his performance as Menelaus in L'Odissea.

Tozzi died of respiratory failure, aged 57.

Selected filmography

 Under the Sun of Rome (1948, screenwriter)
 Heaven over the Marshes (1949)
 Women Without Names (1950)
 Il caimano del Piave (1951)
 Four Ways Out (1951) - Luigi Girosi
 The Bandit of Tacca Del Lupo (1952) - Lt. Magistrelli
 Fratelli d'Italia (1952)
 Three Girls from Rome (1952 - screenwriter)
 Carmen proibita (1953) - José Salviatti
 Musoduro (1953) - Marco / Musoduro
 The Steel Rope (1953) - Filippo
 Casta Diva (1954) - Gaetano Donizetti
 Nel gorgo del peccato (1954) - Alberto Valli
 House of Ricordi (1954) - Arrigo Boito
 I cinque dell'Adamello (1954) - Leonida
 The Lost City (1955) - Rafael
 The Red Cloak (1955) - Luca de Bardi
 Folgore Division (1955) - Sergeant Turchi
 La ladra (1955) - Nino
 Un po' di cielo (1955)
 Songs of Italy (1955) 
 Beatrice Cenci (1956) - Olimpio Calvetti
 East of Kilimanjaro (1957) - Dr. Enrico Trino
 The Sky Burns (1958) - Marchi
 Quando gli angeli piangono (1958)
 El Alamein (1958) - Capitano Valerio Bruschi
 The Defeated Victor (1958 - screenwriter)
 Quai des illusions (1959) - Fausto
 Un uomo facile (1959) 
 Dagli Appennini alle Ande (1959) - Marco's father
 Le secret du Chevalier d'Éon (1959) 
 The Night of the Great Attack (1959) - Captain Zanco Di Monforte
 Questo amore ai confini del mondo (1960) - Don Claudio
 Constantine and the Cross (1961) - Hadrian
 Saint-Tropez Blues (1961) - Nino Trabucci, le peintre
 The Return of Doctor Mabuse (1961) - Warden Wolf
 El Cid (1961) - Dolfos
 The Wonders of Aladdin (1961) - Grand Vizier
 The Legion's Last Patrol (1962) - Brascia
 Swordsman of Siena (1962) - Hugo
 The Shortest Day (1963) - Uno dei soldati combattenti (uncredited)
 Shéhérazade (1963) - Barmak
 Gibraltar (1964) - Paoli
 The Visit (1964) - Darvis
 The Treasure of the Aztecs (1965) - Benito Juárez
 Pyramid of the Sun God (1965) - (uncredited)
 The Agony and the Ecstasy (1965) - Foreman
 I coltelli del vendicatore (1966) - Hagen
 El hombre que mató a Billy el Niño (1967) - Pat Garrett
 The Sailor from Gibraltar (1967) - Captain
 The Appointment (1969) - Renzo
 La Faute de l'abbé Mouret (1970) - Jeanbernat
 A Man Called Sledge (1970) - Maximum security prisoner
 Mazzabubù... Quante corna stanno quaggiù? (1971) - Il marito eschimese
 Between Miracles (1971) - Primario
 The Deserter (1971) - Orozco
 Trastevere (1971) - Man near Joseph at St. Maria in Trastevere (uncredited)
 The Valachi Papers (1972) - Albert Anastasia
 The Sicilian Connection (1972)
 The Funny Face of the Godfather (1973) - Tony Malonzo
 Chino (1973) - Cruz
 The Bloody Hands of the Law (1973) - Nicolò Patrovita
 Mean Frank and Crazy Tony (1973) - Massara
 War Goddess (1973) - General
 Cry of a Prostitute (1974) - Don Ricuzzo Cantimo
 Crazy Joe (1974) - Frank
 The Left Hand of the Law (1975) - Giulio Costello
 L'altro Dio (1975) - Daniele Corsin
 The Sicilian Cross (1976) - Luigi Nicoletta
 Il colpaccio (1976)
 Oh, Serafina! (1976) - Carlo Vigeva
 Fear in the City (1976) - Esposito
 The Black Stallion (1979) - Rescue Captain

References

External links

1921 births
1978 deaths
Italian male film actors
20th-century Italian screenwriters
Italian male screenwriters
Male actors from Rome
Deaths from emphysema
20th-century Italian male actors
20th-century Italian male writers